Niobe, regina di Tebe is an opera in three acts by Agostino Steffani, premiered at Salvatortheater, the Munich court theatre on 5 January 1688, during the carnival season . It is a tragedy focusing on the Ancient Greek character of Niobe.  The libretto is by Luigi Orlandi, after Ovid's Metamorphoses. The score is in the National Library in Vienna. Excerpts have been published in Riemann Ausgewählte Werke iii. Long neglected, the opera was revived at Alice Tully Hall in New York City by the Clarion Music Society in 1977. More recently the work was mounted in Schwetzingen in 2008, in London in 2010, and in Boston in 2011.

Roles

Recordings

References

External links 
 Site of the Balthasar Neumann Ensemble's performance of Niobe at the Schwetzingen Festival 2008
 Site of the 2010 Covent Garden production (archived page)
 Review of the 2010 Covent Garden production from The Independent
 Site of the Boston Early Music Festival production

1688 operas
Italian-language operas
Operas
Operas by Agostino Steffani
Operas based on classical mythology